Antti Louhisto (1 January 1918, Virolahti – 17 July 1989) was a Finnish sculptor. He was third son of Anton and Marianna Louhisto.

Louhisto was rewarded Pro Finlandia in 1965.

References
 Kauko Louhisto – Lyhyt elämänkerta: Antti Louhisto, kuvanveistäjä 

1918 births
1989 deaths
People from Virolahti
20th-century Finnish sculptors
Pro Finlandia Medals of the Order of the Lion of Finland